Carolyn Jayne Davidson (born 18 April 1964) is a British diplomat who has been the British consul general to Osaka since August 2021. She was previously the British ambassador to Guatemala from November 2017 to August 2019.

Career 
Davidson joined the Foreign Office in 1986. She succeeded her husband Tom Carter.

References

External links 
 

Living people
1964 births
Ambassadors of the United Kingdom to Guatemala
21st-century British diplomats
British women ambassadors
Japan–United Kingdom relations